Novo Aripuanã is a municipality located in the Brazilian state of Amazonas.

History

The region was originally inhabited by the Toras, Barés, Muras, Urupás, Araras and other indigenous peoples.
The first records of European penetration to the Madeira River are from 1637, when Pedro Teixeira travelled from Belém to Quito in Ecuador.
The municipality of Novo Aripuanã was created by state law 96 of 19 December 1955 from parts of the municipalities of Borba and Manicoré.
It contained the district of Foz do Aripuanã with the sub-districts of Alvorada, Manicorezinho and Itapinima, and the district of Sumaúma with the sub-districts of Alvorada, Manicorezinho and Itapinima.
The town of Foz do Aripuanã was elevated to the status of a city, named Novo Aripuanã.
The first prefect of the municipality, Wilson Paula de Sá, took office on 10 February 1956.

Location

The population as of 2020 was 26,046. 
The seat of the municipality is located where the Aripuanã River merges into the Madeira River.

Conservation

The municipality contains 8% of the  Apuí Mosaic, a jointly-managed collection of conservation units.
It contains the  Manicoré State Forest, a sustainable use conservation unit created in 2005.
It contains 39% of the  Rio Madeira Sustainable Development Reserve, created in 2006.
It contains the  Juma Sustainable Development Reserve, created in 2006 to support sustainable extraction of forest resources by the traditional population.
It contains 67% of the Campos Amazônicos National Park, a  protected area created in 2006 that protects an unusual enclave of cerrado vegetation in the Amazon rainforest.
It contains the  Guariba State Park, created in 2005.
It contains 28% of the  Guariba Extractive Reserve, also created in 2005.

The municipality  contains about 45% of the  Manicoré Biological Reserve, created by decree in May 2016 in the week before the provisional removal of president Dilma Rousseff.
It also contains 29% of the  Acari National Park, which was created at the same time.
The municipality contains about 74% of the  Aripuanã National Forest, a sustainable development unit also created at that time.

References

Sources

Municipalities in Amazonas (Brazilian state)